Barbara Cohen (1932–1992) was an American author of children's literature.

Personal life
Cohen graduated from Barnard College (BA, 1954) and from Rutgers University (MA, 1957).  She taught high school English in several cities in New Jersey, and wrote a long-running newspaper column entitled "Books and Things."  She and her husband Gene had three daughters, Leah, Sara, and Rebecca.

She was a resident of Bridgewater Township, New Jersey.

Bibliography
She wrote more than thirty books in a range of genres, from picture books (The Carp in the Bathtub, 1972) to retellings of Biblical stories (e.g., The Binding of Isaac, 1978; David, 1995) to classical literature (Four Canterbury Tales, 1987) to young adult dystopias (Unicorns in the Rain, 1980).

She was recognized several times for her work, being awarded the Association of Jewish Libraries Sydney Taylor Body-of-Work Award (1980) and the Sydney Taylor Picture Book Award (1981).

Among her other books are,:
 Thank You, Jackie Robinson (1974) – companion to R—My Name is Rosie and The Innkeeper’s Daughter
 Bitter Herbs and Honey (1976)
 Where's Florrie? (1976)
 Benny (1977)
 R—My Name is Rosie (1978) – companion to The Innkeeper's Daughter and Thank You, Jackie Robinson 
 The Innkeeper's Daughter (1979)- autobiographical fiction, companion to Thank You, Jackie Robinson and R—My Name is Rosie 
 Lovely Vassilisa (1980)
 I Am Joseph (1980)
 Fat Jack (1980)
 Yussel's Prayer: a Yom Kippur Story (1981)
 Queen for a Day (1981)
 Gooseberries to oranges (1982)
 King of the Seventh Grade (1982)
 Seven Daughters and Seven Sons (1982)
 The Demon Who Would Not Die (1982)
 Lovers' Games (1983)
 Molly's Pilgrim (1983) - adapted as the Academy Award-winning short film of the same name in 1985
 Here Come the Purim Players (1984)
 Roses (1984)
 The Secret Grover (1985)
 The Donkey's Story: a Bible Story (1985)
 Coasting (1985)
 Even Higher (1987)- a retelling of If Not Higher by Isaac Leib Peretz
 First Fast (1987)
 Four Canterbury Tales (1987)
 The Christmas Revolution (1987)- companion to The Long Way Home
 The Orphan Game (1988)
 People Like Us (1989)
 Tell Us Your Secret (1989)
 The Long Way Home (1990) – companion to The Christmas Revolution
 213 Valentines (1991)
 Make a Wish, Molly (1994)
 Robin Hood and Little John (1995)
 The Chocolate Wolf (1996)

Other awards 

 1983: National Jewish Book Award in the Children's Literature category for King of the Seventh Grade
1983: National Jewish Book Award in the Children Picture Book category for Yussel's Prayer: A Yom Kippur Story

References

External links 
 Barbara Cohen on GoodReads

20th-century American novelists
20th-century American women writers
Jewish American artists
American women novelists
Barnard College alumni
Jewish American novelists
People from Bridgewater Township, New Jersey
Writers from New Jersey
1932 births
1992 deaths
20th-century American Jews